The Eastern Ranges rock-skink (Liopholis modesta) is a species of skink, a lizard in the family Scincidae. The species is endemic to eastern  Australia.

References

Skinks of Australia
Liopholis
Reptiles described in 1968
Taxa named by Glen Milton Storr